Bud's Recruit is a 1918 American short comedy film directed by King Vidor. A print survives at the UCLA Film and Television Archive. In February 2020, the film was shown at the 70th Berlin International Film Festival, as part of a retrospective dedicated to King Vidor's career.

Cast
 Wallace Brennan as Bud Gilbert
 Robert Gordon as Reggie Gilbert
 Ruth Hampton as Edith
 Mildred Davis as Edith's sister

Production
Bud’s Recruit is one of ten short films written and produced by Judge Willis Brown that were directed by King Vidor. These were filmed at Boy City Film Company in Culver City, California and released by General Film Company between January and May 1918.
Bud’s Recruit is unique in that it is the only film from the Judge Willis Brown series that survives. This film is the only one of the series in which Judge Willis Brown did not appear.

Theme
Brown was a Salt Lake City juvenile court judge who specialized in “rehabilitating juvenile offenders.” He based the series on his experiences operating his “Boy’s Cities” (not to be confused with Boys Town). The movies depict “inter-ethnic” city youth facing and resolving social and moral challenges constructively.
Written and filmed shortly after the United States entered WWI in 1917, the Bud’s Recruit alludes to the isolationist impulses that affected recruitment efforts. The movie is pro-intervention, though Vidor presents a tough-in-check portrayal of the under-age brother (Bud) pro-enlistment enthusiasm. His chastening ultimately  served to overcome his mother’s and older brothers’ resistance to supporting the war effort. His older brother (Reggie) is “Bud’s Recruit”.

Footnotes

References
Baxter, John. 1976. King Vidor. Simon & Schuster, Inc. Monarch Film Studies. LOC Card Number 75-23544.
Durgnat, Raymond and Simmon, Scott. 1988. King Vidor, American. University of California Press, Berkeley. 

1918 films
Films directed by King Vidor
Silent American comedy films
American silent short films
American black-and-white films
1918 comedy films
1918 short films
American comedy short films
1910s American films